Parliamentary elections were held in Benin on 31 March 2007, having been delayed from an earlier date of 25 March due to organisational difficulties. Twenty-six political parties and 2,158 candidates contested the elections for the 83 seats in the National Assembly; there were 24 constituencies and 17,487 polling stations.

The elections saw the Cowry Forces for an Emerging Benin emerge as the largest party, winning 35 of the 83 seats. Turnout was estimated at 58.69%. The new National Assembly was sworn in on 23 April.

Results

References

Elections in Benin
Benin
Parliamentary election
National Assembly (Benin)
Election and referendum articles with incomplete results